Innerdalen is a valley in Sunndal Municipality in Møre og Romsdal county, Norway. In 1967, the valley was established as Norway's first nature reserve. It lies within the Trollheimen mountain range.

The valley is regularly visited by mountain climbers.  Some of the mountains include Store Trolla (highest in Trollheimen), Skarfjellet, and Innerdalstårnet.  For glacier hiking, there is a glacier on top of Kongskrona called Vinnufonna.

In 2001, Norsk Tindeklub (Norwegian Mountaineering Association) released a mountain guide for Innerdalen (in Norwegian) and they also have a private cabin, Giklingdalshytta, beneath the mountain Innerdalstårnet.  The Norwegian Mountain Touring Association has two cabins in the valley, Innerdalshytta (originally built 1889) and Renndølsetra.

References

Nature reserves in Norway
Sunndal
Valleys of Møre og Romsdal